Susan Slusser is an American sportswriter who works for the San Francisco Chronicle, covering the San Francisco Giants of Major League Baseball. She was the first woman to serve as president of the Baseball Writers' Association of America.

Career
Slusser previously worked for the Dallas Morning News in 1995 and 1996, covering the Texas Rangers of Major League Baseball (MLB). She also served as a beat writer in the National Basketball Association. She worked in Sacramento, California for the Sacramento Bee, where she covered the Sacramento Kings, and Orlando, Florida for the Orlando Sentinel, where she covered the Orlando Magic. Beginning in 1999, Slusser worked for the San Francisco Chronicle, covering the Oakland Athletics of MLB. After more than two decades covering the A's, she became the San Francisco Giants beat writer for the Chronicle starting in 2021.

Slusser was elected as the vice-president of the Baseball Writers' Association of America (BBWAA) in October 2011. The next year, she was voted the president of the BBWAA, the first woman to serve in the role. In 2014, she was elected to the BBWAA board.

She has published two books, 100 Things A’s Fans Need to Know and Do Before They Die in 2014, and If These Walls Could Talk, Tales from the Oakland A’s Dugout, Locker Room and Press Box, co-authored with Ken Korach, in 2019.

Awards 
The National Sports Media Association named Slusser and fellow Chronicle sports scribe Ann Killion co-California Sportswriters of the Year in 2019. Slusser was the first team beat sportswriter to win the award.

In 2017, she won a Northern California Area Emmy for her work on "SportsTalk Live: Women in Sports Media". She has also won recognition from the San Francisco Press Club, the Peninsula Press Club, and the Association for Women in Sports Media.

Personal
Slusser graduated from Stevenson School in Pebble Beach, California, where she did play-by-play announcing for the school radio station. She is a 1988 graduate of Stanford University, with a double major in English and history. While at Stanford, she was the sports editor of the Stanford Daily and played lacrosse. She also called play-by-play Stanford baseball for the campus radio station, including the College World Series, and served as a color commentator for football.

</ref>

References

Living people
American sports journalists
American columnists
San Francisco Chronicle people
Orlando Sentinel people
Writers from the San Francisco Bay Area
Stanford University alumni
The Dallas Morning News people
The Mercury News people
1967 births
American women sportswriters